SEALDs, short for , was a student activist organisation in Japan that organised protests against the ruling coalition headed by Prime Minister Shinzō Abe in 2015 and 2016. Its focus was on the security-related bills enacted in 2015 that allow the Japanese Self-Defense Force to be deployed overseas.

Most of the core members of the SEALDs were involved with a predecessor movement, Students Against Secret Protection Law (SASPL), that protested against Shinzo Abe's Special Secrecy Law from February to December 2014. After the secrecy law was passed, the members went on to form SEALDs on May 3, 2015, Constitution Memorial Day in Japan, to highlight what they believed was Shinzo Abe's blatant disregard of the Constitution. They were especially worried that the Abe cabinet, which enjoyed a majority in both Houses of the Japanese Parliament, would railroad their legislation to reinterpret Article 9 of the Japanese Constitution, allowing Japan to exercise the right of collective self-defence and potentially deploy troops on foreign soil. (Such legislation was passed on September 19, 2015.)

On August 30, 2015, the SEALDs was among protesters who surrounded the National Diet Building in Tokyo. Estimates of the size of the crowd ranged from 30,000 to 120,000. Such a large student movement had not emerged in Japan since the anti-war protests of the 1960s, which forced Shinzo Abe's grandfather Nobusuke Kishi to resign as Prime Minister. However, in contrast to the Zengakuren, whose radicalism eventually alienated the public in the 1960s, the SEALDs attempted to be moderate and non-partisan.

Branches of SEALDs sprang up in various places around Japan. SEALDs KANSAI was established in May 2015, SEALDs TOHOKU on July 20, SEALDs RYUKYU in Okinawa on August 15, and SEALDs TOKAI in Nagoya on September 7.

On December 20, 2015, SEALDs co-founded the Civil Alliance for Peace and Constitutionalism with the Association of Scholars Opposed to the Security-related Laws, Save Constitutional Democracy Japan, Mothers Against War and All Out Action Committee (Sogakari).

The security laws were enacted on March 29, 2016. SEALDs organised a protest in front of the Parliament building the day before.

SEALDs' activities ranged from holding demonstrations, protest rallies and marches, organizing study groups and talk events, to creating booklets, pamphlets and videos, using social media. They also moved around the country to support various movements and candidates, such as the protests in Okinawa against the US military base and the Hokkaido by-elections in April 2016.

SEALDs disbanded on August 15, 2016, one month after the ruling Liberal Democratic Party won a supermajority in the Upper House election. However, co-founder Aki Okuda (奥田愛基) stated that the campaign was not over and urged all of Japan's politicians to continue to protect the Constitution.

References

External links
 SEALDs Website
 SEALDs English Website
 SEALDs KANSAI Website
 SEALDs RYUKU Website

2015 establishments in Japan
2016 disestablishments in Japan
Liberalism in Japan
Organizations established in 2015
Organizations disestablished in 2016
Anti-militarism
Anti-racist organizations
Student protests in Japan
Human rights in Japan
Shinzo Abe